The Temptations with a Lot o' Soul is the fifth studio album by The Temptations for the Gordy (Motown) label released in 1967. Featuring four hit singles, With a Lot o' Soul is the most successful Temptations album from their "classic 5" era, during which David Ruffin, Eddie Kendricks, Paul Williams, Melvin Franklin, and Otis Williams constituted the Temptations' lineup.

Overview 
The four singles from the album, all Top 20 pop/ Top 10 R&B hits, were "(I Know) I'm Losing You", "All I Need", "You're My Everything", and "(Loneliness Made Me Realize) It's You That I Need". three of these four songs also reached the Billboard Pop Top 10 as well.  Norman Whitfield produced most of the tracks here, supporting the Temptations' vocals with a hard-edged soul sound with elements of the music of James Brown.

"(I Know) I'm Losing You", already a nine-month-old hit by the time With a Lot o' Soul was released, opens the album. The rest of the album expands upon the template established by Norman Whitfield with "I'm Losing You". Whitfield and the other With a Lot o' Soul producers, including Ivy Jo Hunter, Smokey Robinson, and, on "All I Need" (in which Ruffin portrays a man who admits to his lover he has been unfaithful and begs her forgiveness), Whitfield's protégé Frank Wilson, supply the group a more modern sound than was present on previous or contemporary Motown releases. Most of the tracks on side A of the album feature brass-heavy, dramatic backing tracks with more prominent uses of electric guitar lines (Whitfield's "(I Know) I'm Losing You" and Ivy Jo Hunter's "Sorry is a Sorry Word" from side B) and shifts in dynamics (Whitfield's "Ain't No Sun Since You've Been Gone", the single "(Loneliness Made Me Realize) It's You That I Need", and the Eddie Kendricks-led "Save My Love for a Rainy Day").

Paul Williams delivers a dramatic performance on the Smokey Robinson-produced "No More Water in the Well",(written by Robinson and fellow Miracles Warren "Pete" Moore and Bobby Rogers, an uptempo number regularly identified as one of his standout performances. Williams and the other Temptations constantly complained about Williams' not being able to sing lead on more album tracks, and on singles as well, but Motown paid their complaints no heed, and continued to rely on David Ruffin's (and occasionally Eddie Kendricks') leads for each single.

Side B begins with "Just One Last Look", written and produced by Holland-Dozier-Holland, Motown's main songwriting and production team. The Temptations were one of the few major Motown acts never to release a single produced by the trio, because of Whitfield's (and previously, Robinson's) tight hold on the group. Brian Holland and Lamont Dozier had to in fact fight for the chance to produce "Just One Last Look" for the Temptations, and Whitfield successfully blocked its release as a single. "Just One Last Look" remains the only H-D-H produced track to appear on any Temptations studio album.

While David Ruffin takes most of the leads on the album and its singles, he shares the spotlight with Eddie Kendricks on the Norman Whitfield/Cornelius Grant/Roger Penzabene love ballad "You're My Everything". Penzabene wrote "You're My Everything" specifically with Kendricks in mind to sing it (Ruffin only sings lead during the bridge), and visualized the singer performing it to a "special girl" Kendricks would pick out of the audience ("You're the girl I sing about/in every love song I sing/You're my everything, girl.").

With a Lot o' Soul concludes with three more ballads: Smokey Robinson's "Now That You've Won Me" (led by Ruffin), Norman Whitfield's "Two Sides to Love" (led by Kendricks), and Robinson's "Don't Send Me Away" (a rare lead showcase for stalwart Temptation Otis Williams).

Track listing 

All lead vocals by David Ruffin except where noted

Side one 
"(I Know) I'm Losing You" (Cornelius Grant, Edward Holland, Jr., Norman Whitfield) 2:26
"Ain't No Sun Since You've Been Gone" (Grant, Sylvia Moy, Whitfield) 2:59
"All I Need" (Frank Wilson, E. Holland, R. Dean Taylor) 3:07
"(Loneliness Made Me Realize) It's You That I Need" (E. Holland, Whitfield) (lead singer: David Ruffin; last verse vocals: Eddie Kendricks, Paul Williams, Melvin Franklin, Otis Williams) 2:35
"No More Water in the Well" (Warren Moore, Smokey Robinson, Bobby Rogers) (lead singer: Paul Williams) 2:59
"Save My Love for a Rainy Day" (Roger Penzabene, Whitfield) (lead singer: Eddie Kendricks) 2:56

Side two 
"Just One Last Look" (Holland–Dozier–Holland) 2:43
"Sorry is a Sorry Word" (E. Holland, Ivy Jo Hunter) 2:27
"You're My Everything" (Grant, Penzabene, Whitfield) (lead singer: Eddie Kendricks; bridge vocals: David Ruffin) 2:57
"Now That You've Won Me" (Robinson) 3:09
"Two Sides to Love" (Moy, Whitfield) (lead singer: Eddie Kendricks) 2:46
"Don't Send Me Away" (Eddie Kendricks, Robinson) (lead singers: Otis Williams, Melvin Franklin) 2:56

Known outtakes 
The following outtakes were included on the Temptations box set Emperors of Soul in 1994.

"I Got Heaven Right Here on Earth" (Kendricks, E. Holland, Whitfield)
Produced by Norman Whitfield, led by David Ruffin
"I'm Doing It All" (Robinson, Grant)
Produced by Smokey Robinson, led by Eddie Kendricks
"Angel Doll" (Stevie Wonder, Clarence Paul, Morris Broadnax)
Produced by Clarence Paul, led by David Ruffin

The following outtakes were included on the Temptations CD set Lost and Found: You've Got to Earn It (1962–1968) in 1999.

"What Am I Gonna Do Without You" (Hunter, Wonder)
Produced by Ivy Jo Hunter, led by David Ruffin
"Love Is What You Make It" (Robinson)
Produced by Smokey Robinson, led by David Ruffin
"No Time" (Robinson, Moore)
Produced by Smokey Robinson, led by Eddie Kendricks
"Last One Out Is Brokenhearted" (William "Mickey" Stevenson, Hunter)
Produced by Ivy Jo Hunter, led by Paul Williams
" I Can't Think of a Thing At All" (Robinson)
Produced by Smokey Robinson, led by Paul Williams
"Forever in My Heart" (Robinson, Rogers)
Produced by Smokey Robinson, led by Paul Williams
"I Now See You Clear Through My Eyes" (Robinson)
Produced by Smokey Robinson, led by Paul Williams
"Camouflage" [Version 2] (Berry Gordy, Jr.)
Produced by Berry Gordy, Jr., led by Eddie Kendricks & David Ruffin
"We'll Be Satisfied" (F. Wilson, Marc Gordon)
Produced by Frank Wilson, led by David Ruffin, Paul Williams & Eddie Kendricks

Personnel 
The Temptations
David Ruffin – vocals  (tenor)
Eddie Kendricks – vocals (tenor/falsetto)
Paul Williams – vocals (baritone)
Melvin Franklin – vocals (bass)
Otis Williams – vocals (tenor/baritone)
with:
The Andantes – additional backing vocals on "All I Need"
Cornelius Grant – guitar on "(I Know) I'm Losing You", "All I Need" and "You're My Everything"
The Funk Brothers – instrumentation:
Earl Van Dyke – keyboards on "(I Know) I'm Losing You", "All I Need" and "Sorry is a Sorry Word"
James Jamerson – bass on "(I Know) I'm Losing You", "All I Need" and "Sorry is a Sorry Word"
Uriel Jones – drums on "(I Know) I'm Losing You" and "All I Need"
Benny Benjamin – drums on "Sorry is a Sorry Word"
Eddie "Bongo" Brown – percussion on "(I Know) I'm Losing You"
Bobbye Hall – percussion on "Sorry is a Sorry Word"
Jack Ashford – tambourine on "(I Know) I'm Losing You" and "Sorry is a Sorry Word", percussion on "All I Need"
Robert White – guitar on "Sorry is a Sorry Word"
Joe Messina – guitar on "Sorry is a Sorry Word"
Eddie Willis – guitar on "Sorry is a Sorry Word"

Production
 Norman Whitfield – "(I Know) I'm Losing You", "Ain't No Sun Since You've Been Gone", "(Loneliness Made Me Realize) It's You That I Need", "Save My Love for a Rainy Day", "You're My Everything" and "Two Sides to Love", Executive Producer 
 Smokey Robinson – "No More Water in the Well", "Now That You've Won Me" and "Don't Send Me Away"
 Frank Wilson – "All I Need"
 Brian Holland and Lamont Dozier –  "Just One Last Look"
 Ivy Jo Hunter – "Sorry is a Sorry Word"

Charts

Weekly charts

Singles

See also 
List of number-one R&B albums of 1967 (U.S.)

References 

1967 albums
The Temptations albums
Gordy Records albums
Albums produced by Norman Whitfield
Albums produced by Smokey Robinson
Albums produced by Frank Wilson (musician)
Albums produced by Ivy Jo Hunter
Albums produced by Brian Holland
Albums produced by Lamont Dozier
Albums recorded at Hitsville U.S.A.